The 1993 Hungarian Grand Prix was a Formula One motor race held at Hungaroring on 15 August 1993. It was the eleventh race of the 1993 Formula One World Championship.

The 77-lap race was won by Damon Hill, driving a Williams-Renault. After retiring from the lead in the previous two races, Hill finally took his first Formula One victory, becoming the first son of a World Champion to win a race himself. Riccardo Patrese finished second in a Benetton-Ford, achieving his final podium finish, with Gerhard Berger third in a Ferrari. Another F1 veteran, Derek Warwick, scored his final points by finishing fourth in a Footwork-Mugen-Honda.

Hill's teammate and Drivers' Championship leader, Alain Prost, took pole position, but stalled on the warm-up lap and had to start from the back of the grid. He subsequently lost several laps due to a faulty rear wing - giving an interview for French television while the Williams team worked on his car.

Report

Qualifying
The two Williamses were 1-2 in qualifying in Hungary, with Prost on pole ahead of Hill, Schumacher, Senna, Patrese and Berger.

Race
Prost stalled on the parade lap, and had to start at the back. At the start, Schumacher got pushed down by Senna, Berger (who was already ahead of Patrese) and Patrese. Hill was leading Senna, Berger, Patrese, Schumacher and Alesi. 

Schumacher tried to pass Berger on lap 4 but spun and dropped back to 10th. Both McLarens had throttle problems, Andretti slowing down in front of Schumacher on lap 16 and making Schumacher spin again, dropping down to 14th, right behind the recovering Prost. Senna also retired on lap 18 with throttle problems marking the first time since the race was introduced in 1986 that he failed to finish either 1st or 2nd, as everyone pitted except the Williamses and Schumacher. This left Hill ahead of Patrese, Prost, Schumacher, Berger and Alesi. 

Then, Prost had to go into the pits because of problems with his rear wing. He rejoined seven laps behind. On lap 23, Alesi spun off as he hit the armco barrier and retired as a result of backmarkers just in front of the French Sicilian, meanwhile Patrese waved through Schumacher who took second. However, he retired three laps later with fuel pump problems. Berger pitted from third and rejoined in fifth but he quickly passed Brundle and then Warwick to get back third. Pierluigi Martini looked sure for scoring his first point since San Marino the previous year before the Minardi driver would later crash out of 6th position with only 18 laps to go. Hill took his first ever win ahead of Patrese, Berger, Warwick, Brundle and Wendlinger. It would also be the last race that former Williams driver Thierry Boutsen would finish, as the Belgian veteran retired from Formula 1 at the very next race after 10 years in the sport.

Classification

Qualifying

Race

Championship standings after the race

Drivers' Championship standings

Constructors' Championship standings

References

Hungarian Grand Prix
Hungarian Grand Prix
Grand Prix
Hungarian Grand Prix